Timothy W. Finchem (born April 19, 1947) is an American lawyer and retired golf administrator, who served as commissioner of golf's PGA Tour from 1994 to 2016. He served in the White House for two years during the administration of President Jimmy Carter, from 1978 to 1979. He was inducted into the World Golf Hall of Fame in 2021.

Early life and education
Finchem was born in Ottawa, Illinois. He graduated from Princess Anne High School in Virginia Beach, Virginia. He attended the University of Richmond on a debate scholarship, receiving his Bachelor of Arts degree in 1969. While at Richmond, Finchem was a member of the Phi Gamma Delta Rho Chi chapter. Finchem later graduated from the University of Virginia School of Law in 1973.

Early career
After practicing law in Virginia Beach for three years, Finchem served in the White House during the administration of Jimmy Carter as Deputy Advisor to the President in the Office of Economic Affairs in 1978 and 1979. In the early 1980s, Finchem co-founded the National Marketing and Strategies Group in Washington, D.C.

PGA Tour Commissioner
Finchem took the position of Commissioner on June 1, 1994, succeeding Deane Beman, who retired after nearly 20 years in the post. Finchem had previously served as Vice President of Business Affairs, Deputy Commissioner, and Chief Operating Officer of the Tour.

As Commissioner, Finchem expanded the earnings opportunities for PGA Tour players both domestically and internationally. He presided over three television broadcasting deals (1997, 2001 and 2005).

In 2006, the total PGA Tour purse was $256.8 million, up from $56.4 million in 1994. That remarkable growth has a lot to do with Tiger Woods, but Finchem's supporters also give him some of the credit. 

Finchem received the 2001 Old Tom Morris Award from the Golf Course Superintendents Association of America, GCSAA's highest honor. He is a single-figure handicap golfer.

Finchem was succeeded by Jay Monahan on January 1, 2017.

References

External links
Official site of the PGA Tour
PGA Tour Executive Bio

PGA Tour commissioners
World Golf Hall of Fame inductees
American chief operating officers
Virginia lawyers
University of Richmond alumni
University of Virginia School of Law alumni
Carter administration personnel
Princess Anne High School alumni
People from Ottawa, Illinois
People from Virginia Beach, Virginia
1947 births
Living people